Khariar (Sl. No.: 72) is a Vidhan Sabha constituency of Nuapada district, Odisha.

This constituency includes Khariar NAC, Khariar block, Boden block and Sinapali block.

Elected Members

Thirteen elections were held between 1961 and 2014.
Elected members from the Khariar constituency are:

2019 Election Result

2014 Election Result
In 2014 election, Bhartiya Janta Party candidate Duryodhan Majhi defeated Indian National Congress candidate Adhiraj Mohan Panigrahi by a margin of 7,126 votes.

2009 Election Result
In 2009 election, Bharatiya Janata Party candidate Hitesh Kumar Bagartti defeated Biju Janata Dal candidate Duryodhan Majhi by a margin of 11,366 votes.

Notes

References

Assembly constituencies of Odisha
Nuapada district